The Sorowako mine is a large mine in the east of Indonesia in Sulawesi. Sorowako represents one of the largest nickel reserve in Indonesia having estimated reserves of 109.4 million tonnes of ore grading 1.79% nickel. The 109.4 million tonnes of ore contains 1.95 million tonnes of nickel metal.

References 

Nickel mines in Indonesia